Rash Sarkar (born 22 December 1944) is an Indian former cricketer. He played two first-class matches for Bengal in 1966/67.

See also
 List of Bengal cricketers

References

External links
 

1944 births
Living people
Indian cricketers
Bengal cricketers
Cricketers from Kolkata